Florin Lovin (born 11 February 1982) is a Romanian former professional footballer who played mainly as a  defensive midfielder.

Club career
Lovin played for FCM Bacău between 2001 and 2005, prior to joining Steaua București. He made his Divizia A debut on 25 May 2002 in the FCM Bacău 1–2 defeat at FC National. As of 1 January 2008, he played 132 games in Liga I scoring three goals.

On 7 July 2008, Steaua's coach Marius Lăcătuş sent Lovin to Steaua II București for the indiscipline during training. Steaua's board have announced that Lovin has been transfer-listed. On 8 July 2008 Gigi Becali said that he would not let Lovin go for less than €800 000. On 23 July 2008, Steaua's coach called him back to first team. In 2009–10, Lovin was demoted to the B squad again. On 20 July 2009, Lovin was transferred to TSV 1860 Munich.

On 12 September 2009, Lovin suffered a serious injury during a clash with Youssef Mokhtari in the TSV 1860 Munich-Greuther Fürth match. He suffered a ligament break, which kept him off the field for half a year. After completing 26 matches for the TSV 1860 during the 2010–11 season, his contract was terminated.

He signed a three-year contract with Greek Super League side Kerkyra in July 2011 but his contract terminated in December 2011.

Honours
Steaua București
 Liga I: 2004–05, 2005–06
 Supercupa României: 2006
Astra Giurgiu
 Liga I: 2015–16
 Supercupa României: 2016

References

External links
 
 

1982 births
Living people
Sportspeople from Piatra Neamț
Romanian footballers
Association football midfielders
Liga I players
FCM Bacău players
FC Steaua București players
CS Concordia Chiajna players
FC Astra Giurgiu players
Liga II players
FC Steaua II București players
2. Bundesliga players
TSV 1860 Munich players
Super League Greece players
A.O. Kerkyra players
Austrian Football Bundesliga players
Kapfenberger SV players
SV Mattersburg players
Romanian expatriate footballers
Romanian expatriate sportspeople in Germany
Expatriate footballers in Germany
Romanian expatriate sportspeople in Greece
Expatriate footballers in Greece
Romanian expatriate sportspeople in Austria
Expatriate footballers in Austria